The women's 3000 metres steeplechase event at the 2007 Summer Universiade was held on 12 August.

Results

References

3000
2007 in women's athletics
2007